Triplophysa gejiuensis (Gejiu blind loach) is a species of stone loach endemic to China. It is a blind, subterranean fish found in underground river in Gejiu, Yunnan.

References

G
Freshwater fish of China
Endemic fauna of Yunnan
Cave fish
Fish described in 1979
Taxonomy articles created by Polbot